Lone Fischer (born 8 September 1988) is a German handball player for Buxtehuder SV and the Germany national team.

References

1988 births
Living people
German female handball players
People from Eckernförde
Sportspeople from Schleswig-Holstein